Parker Stanfield (born June 20, 1990) is an American professional ice hockey player. He is currently playing for the Peoria Rivermen of the SPHL.

Stanfield played four seasons (2007 - 2011) of major junior hockey in the Western Hockey League (WHL), scoring 58 goals and 72 assists for 139 points, while registering 248 penalty minutes in 272 games played.

After playing 80 games in the ECHL with the Bakersfield Condors, Stanfield joined HK Poprad where he played eight Slovak Extraliga games during the 2012-13 season.

On July 8, 2013, Stanfield returned the ECHL, signing for the 2013–14 season with the Colorado Eagles.

Career statistics

References

External links

Living people
1990 births
Bakersfield Condors (1998–2015) players
Everett Silvertips players
Florida Everblades players
HK Poprad players
Peoria Rivermen
Prince George Cougars players
South Carolina Stingrays players
Sportspeople from Orange County, California
Ice hockey players from California
American men's ice hockey right wingers
American expatriate ice hockey players in Canada
American expatriate ice hockey players in Slovakia